Samariscus triocellatus is a species of flatfish in the family Samaridae.

References 

Samaridae
Taxa named by Loren P. Woods
Animals described in 1960